Mihithah Loabi Dheyshey is a Maldivian television series written by Ahmed Azmeel and directed by Aishath Rishmy. Produced by their son, Ismail Aziel Azmeel under Yaaraa Productions, the series stars Ahmed Azmeel, Aishath Rishmy and Mariyam Shakeela in pivotal roles.

Cast

Main
 Ahmed Azmeel as Nawal
 Aishath Rishmy as Hudha
 Mariyam Shakeela as Nafeesa

Recurring
 Hamid Ali as Jaufar
 Aminath Shareef as Khadheeja
 Waleedha Waleed as Haatha
 Mohamed Faisal as Shareef
 Yooshau Jameel as Yooshau

Guest
 Ghafoor as a tenant (Episode 3)

Episodes

Soundtrack

Accolades

References

Serial drama television series
Maldivian television shows